Shurjeh-ye Turaghay (also Romanized as Shūrjeh-ye Ţūrāghāy and Shūrjeh-ye Ţūrāghā'ī) is a village in Leylan-e Shomali Rural District, Leylan District, Malekan County, East Azerbaijan Province, Iran. As of the 2006 census, its population was 308, in 65 families.

References 

Populated places in Malekan County